Batman: Bad Blood is a 2016 American animated superhero film which is the 24th film of the DC Universe Animated Original Movies and the sixth film in the DC Animated Movie Universe. It serves as a sequel to the 2015 film Batman vs. Robin. The film was released on January 20, 2016 for iTunes and the Google Play Store, and on DVD and Blu-ray on February 2. While not a direct adaptation of a particular storyline, it derived from Grant Morrison's run on Batman, primarily the Leviathan story arcs.

Jason O'Mara, Sean Maher, and Stuart Allan reprise their roles from the previous films as Batman, Robin, and Nightwing, with Morena Baccarin returning from Son of Batman as Talia al Ghul, while Yvonne Strahovski joins as Batwoman.

Plot
Six months after the defeat of the Court of Owls, Batwoman intercepts a crowd of criminals in Gotham City that includes Electrocutioner, Tusk, Firefly, Killer Moth, and others. When a fight ensues, Batman arrives. They are confronted by the apparent leader of the criminals, a masked man calling himself "the Heretic", who reminds Batman of his vision of Damian Wayne as Batman. Heretic detonates explosives planted within the facility. Batman flings Batwoman to safety and apparently perishes in the explosion.

Two weeks later, a concerned Alfred Pennyworth sends a distress signal to Nightwing. Meanwhile, at a monastery in the Himalayas, Bruce's twelve-year-old son Damian Wayne watches a news report of Batman's disappearance and sets out to return to Gotham. Batwoman's civilian alter-ego Katherine Kane meets with her father Jacob Kane explaining she feels responsible for Batman's apparent death. In the past, Katherine was traumatized by an incident in which her sister Elizabeth and mother Gabrielle were abducted, held for ransom, and eventually killed by their captors when her father attempted to rescue them, while she was the sole survivor. After her time in the military, she became a promiscuous drunkard who was saved by Batman from street thugs, which motivated her to never need to be saved again, resulting in her becoming Batwoman.

Batman apparently resurfaces and is quickly noticed by Robin and Katherine. Both of them intercept Batman and deduce that it is Nightwing wearing an older version of the Batsuit. They begin their own investigations into the Heretic, unconvinced that Bruce is truly dead. The Heretic and his henchmen attack Wayne Enterprises, forcing Lucius Fox to open the way into the vault by threatening his son Luke. Though Nightwing and Damian arrive, they are unable to prevent the Heretic from escaping with Wayne technology, and Lucius is injured. Before they leave, the Heretic kills Electrocutioner when the latter is about to kill Robin.

The Heretic returns to his headquarters, where it is revealed that he is working for Damian's mother, Talia al Ghul. They are holding Bruce prisoner and the Mad Hatter is slowly trying to brainwash him. The Heretic breaks into the Batcave and kidnaps Damian. He reveals himself as a clone of Damian, created by a genetics program run by Ra's al Ghul and the League of Shadows. They used Damian's DNA to genetically engineer a perfect soldier with accelerated growth and development, but he was the only subject of the program to survive. He wishes to have Damian's memories and personality implanted within his own brain so that he can feel like a real person, but Talia arrives and kills the Heretic for defying her orders. Nightwing and Batwoman then arrive, having located Damian through a tracker in his costume. They are joined by Luke, clad in an advanced combat exosuit designed by his father and styling himself as Batwing. The three rescue Bruce and Damian, but Talia and most of her henchmen escape.
 
A week passes and Bruce seems to have recovered, though he remains adamant that Katherine and Luke should not be involved. After Katherine is forced to fight her father after he suddenly attacks her for no reason and having no memory of attacking her after she hit him in the head, Dick realizes that Bruce is still under the effects of the Mad Hatter's mind control. Luke realizes that the League of Shadows are planning to brainwash a number of world leaders at a tech summit held by Bruce. As the brainwashing takes place, Nightwing, Robin, Batwoman, Alfred, and Batwing arrive and fight Talia and her henchmen. During the fight, the Calculator is killed, interrupting the mind control and killing the Mad Hatter in the process as well. Bruce, still brainwashed, defeats Nightwing. Talia orders him to kill Nightwing and Damian, but Bruce resists the brainwashing. Incensed, Talia escapes in a vessel, only for Onyx, a subordinate of the Heretic, to confront and attack her to avenge Heretic's death. The vessel crashes and explodes, implying their deaths. Bruce is later seen comforting Damian over Talia's supposed death. Alfred remarks to Dick that despite Talia's madness, she was still Damian's mother.

As the Bat-Signal shines in Gotham City, Batwoman, Batwing, and Nightwing meet Batman and Robin on top of the police station for their nightly patrol, the former two now officially part of the team. When everyone arrives, they notice a robbery in progress down the street being committed by the Penguin. One by one, they all swing, glide, or fly off to stop him. On a nearby building, Batgirl observes the group and prepares to join the pursuit.

Voice cast

Sequel
A sequel titled Batman: Hush was released in 2019.

Reception

Critical reception

Sales
The film earned $4,806,737 from domestic home video sales.

Notes

References

External links

 
 Batman: Bad Blood at The World's Finest

2016 animated films
2016 direct-to-video films
2016 action films
2010s American animated films
2010s direct-to-video animated superhero films
2010s animated superhero films
2016 LGBT-related films
American LGBT-related films
Animated action films
Animated Batman films
DC Animated Movie Universe
Direct-to-video sequel films
Fiction about mind control
Films scored by Frederik Wiedmann
LGBT-related animated superhero films
Films about cloning
American animated superhero films
Films set in 2016
Films directed by Jay Oliva
2010s English-language films